Arnaud Héguy (born 23 January 1985) is a former French international professional rugby union player.

As a Hooker, Héguy played for Aviron Bayonnais where he was very appreciated by the fans of the club because he's from Bayonne. In 2011 he left Bayonne to play for Biarritz Olympique.

External links

French rugby union players
Biarritz Olympique players
US Dax players
Sportspeople from Bayonne
1985 births
Living people
Aviron Bayonnais players
FC Grenoble players
Rugby union hookers